The 2013–14 season was Bristol City's 116th season as a professional football club. It was the first season since 2006-7 that City had played in the third tier of English football, League One, following their relegation from the Championship the previous season.

Sean O'Driscoll, who had overseen City's relegation, remained in charge at Ashton Gate in the early months of the season, until he was sacked and replaced by Steve Cotterill in November 2013.

League One data

League table

Result summary

Results by round

Kits

|
|

Squad

Statistics

|-
|colspan=14|Players currently out on loan:

|-
|colspan=14|Players who left the club:

|}

Captains

Goalscorers

Disciplinary record

Suspensions served

Contracts

Transfers

In

 Total spending:  ~ £600,000+
Notes
1 The player swap included Jay Emmanuel-Thomas coming into the club and Paul Anderson leaving for Ipswich Town.

Loans In

Out

 Total income:  ~ £1,500,000
Notes
1 The player swap included Jay Emmanuel-Thomas coming into the club and Paul Anderson leaving for Ipswich Town.

Loans Out

Fixtures and results

Pre-season

League One

FA Cup

League Cup

League Trophy

Overall summary

Summary

Score overview

References

2013-14
2013–14 Football League One by team